Posey is an unincorporated community in Raleigh County, West Virginia, United States.

The community was named after Posey Hurst, according to local history.

References 

Unincorporated communities in West Virginia
Unincorporated communities in Raleigh County, West Virginia